Marianna Grigorievna Roshal-Stroyeva (23 January 1925 – 22 October 2022) was a Russian film director.

Biography
Marianna was born in Moscow on 23 January 1925 to film directors Grigori Roshal and Vera Stroyeva. While evacuating from fighting in World War II, she edited films for Kazakhfilm. She graduated from the directing department at the Gerasimov Institute of Cinematography in 1948 under the direction of Lev Kuleshov.

In 1956, Roshal-Stroyeva directed the film The White Poodle alongside  at the Odesa Film Studio, based on a story by Aleksandr I. Kuprin. In 1967, she began working on literary translations and co-authored a historical novel.

Roshal-Stroyeva was a member of the Guild of Film Directors of Russia. In her later life, she lived in London. She was the mother of conceptual artist .

Roshal-Stroyeva died in London on 22 October 2022, at the age of 97.

Filmography
The White Poodle (1956)
 (1961)
Probuzhdeniye (1968)

References

1925 births
2022 deaths
Soviet film directors
Russian film directors
Mass media people from Moscow